Events from the year 1877 in China.

Incumbents
 Guangxu Emperor (3rd year)
 Regent: Empress Dowager Cixi

Events 
 Dungan Revolt (1862–77)
 Northern Chinese Famine of 1876–79
 Shandong Famine Relief Committee was established with the participation of diplomats, businessmen, and Protestant and Roman Catholic missionaries to combat the famine
 Woosung Road railway purchased and dismantled by Viceroy of Liangjiang Shen Baozhen

Deaths 
 Gu Taiqing (Chinese: 顾太清; Pinyin: Gù Tàiqīng; 1799 – c. 1877) writer and poet, one of the top-ranked women poets of the Qing Dynasty.
 Yaqub Beg, killed in the Qing reconquest of Xinjiang

References